Juania australis, the Chonta palm, is a species of flowering plant in the family Arecaceae, the only species in the genus Juania. It is a solitary trunked palm tree which is endemic to the Juan Fernández Islands archipelago in the southeast Pacific Ocean west of Chile.

This palm is slow growing and has a green trunk; plants are either male or female. It is threatened by habitat loss. Only one mature tree grows outside its native island habitat. It is on the IUCN Red List of Vulnerable species.

Cultivation
Juania australis is extremely rare in cultivation. Seeds from the Chonta palm are banned from being exported from the Juan Fernández Islands by the Chilean government, and so are virtually impossible to get hold of. The palm is also extremely hard to grow as it has very particular requirements, preferring cool night temperatures and summer temperatures below .

It can grow successfully in cultivation for years and then die for no apparent reason. They have been grown successfully in San Francisco, but two specimens were lost during an unusually hot summer. There is a large  specimen at Earlscliffe in Dublin, Ireland, growing well where the climate seems to suit this rare palm tree.

See also
Fernandezian Region
Juan Fernández Islands Flora

References

Endemic flora of the Juan Fernández Islands
Ceroxyloideae
Monotypic Arecaceae genera
Taxonomy articles created by Polbot
Taxa named by Carl Georg Oscar Drude